Tinatin "Tika" Patsatsia (born 18 October 1981 in Tbilisi, Georgia) is a Georgian model, singer, and TV host. She was Miss Tbilisi, Miss Georgia and got third place in Miss Golden Globe.

Biography
In 1987, at the age of six, she went to the Ballet School in Tbilisi. In 1991, Tika started to learn how to play the piano and guitar. In 2000, she created musical group called SETI. In 2003 Tika published her first album. In 2006, she published single Tkvi ras apireb. In 2008, Tika won musical show Wave of Hope. After that, she participated in the national selection for Eurovision 2008, but she did not win it. In 2009, Tika tried again to participate in the National Selection for the Eurovision 2009 with song Miracle, but she did not win again. In 2010, she is hosting Nichieri (ნიჭიერი, Georgian version of Got Talent).

Discography
 2003: Tkvi ras apireb
 2004: Momavlis gza
 2006: Simartlis droa
 2007: Ar gacherde
 2009: Miracle

References

1981 births
Living people
21st-century women singers from Georgia (country)
Pop singers from Georgia (country)
Models from Tbilisi
Tbilisi State University alumni
Beauty pageant winners from Georgia (country)
Musicians from Tbilisi